Buschow is a railway station in the town of Märkisch Luch, Brandenburg, Germany. The station lies south of the Berlin–Lehrte railway and the train services are operated by Ostdeutsche Eisenbahn (ODEG).

Train services
The station is serves by the following service(s):

Regional services  Rathenow - Wustermark - Berlin - Ludwigsfelde - Jüterbog

References

External links
VBB website
Berlin-Brandenburg (VBB) network map

Railway stations in Brandenburg
Buildings and structures in Havelland (district)